East Asian mushrooms and fungi are often used in East Asian cuisine, either fresh or dried. According to Chinese traditional medicine, many types of mushroom affect the eater's physical and emotional wellbeing.

List of mushrooms and fungi

See also
 List of mushroom dishes
Chinese
Chinese cuisine 
Chinese edible mushrooms